The Marasmiaceae are a family of basidiomycete fungi which have white spores.  They mostly have tough stems and the capability of shrivelling up during a dry period and later recovering. The widely consumed edible fungus Lentinula edodes, the shiitake mushroom, is a member of this family. According to a 2008 estimate, the family contains 54 genera and 1590 species.

The family Omphalotaceae, described by A. Bresinsky in 1985 as a segregate from the Tricholomataceae, has been considered synonymous with Marasmiaceae.  However DNA analyses by Moncalvo et al. in 2002 and Matheny et al. in 2006 have now led to that family being accepted by Index Fungorum and most recent references. The following genera are included in that family : Anthracophyllum, Gymnopus, Lentinula, Marasmiellus, Mycetinis, Rhodocollybia, Omphalotus.

Genera

See also
List of Agaricales families

References 

 
Marasmiaceae